Milan Hoek (born 8 September 1991) is a footballer who plays as a midfielder for AFC.

References

External links

1991 births
Living people
Dutch footballers
Association football defenders
Eerste Divisie players
Tweede Divisie players
Derde Divisie players
SC Telstar players
AZ Alkmaar players
Quick Boys players
Amsterdamsche FC players
People from Haarlemmermeer
Footballers from North Holland